The discography of the Serbian industrial rock band dreDDup comprises seven studio albums, one live albums, one video album, and twenty music videos.

The band released their debut album, Mr Borndeads Feast in 2004, after the release of the compact cassette Abnormal Waltz, recorded in 1998. With the release of the band's second studio album, Future Porn Machine, the band abolished the early mainstream concept, and turned towards industrial rock music. However, it was on the follow-up, El Conquistadors, that the band found their own musical style and expression, an artistically oriented industrial rock, captured live on the Live in 219, also found on the third studio album El Conquistadors, released in 2009. In 2009, the band released the Industrial Renaissance DVD featuring the live recording of the 2007 Belgrade performance, and all the music videos the band had made throughout their career. Their fourth release was self-titled dreDDup (album) released for dPulse in 2011. Soon after that one, band announced the last album to be 'Nautilus'. After it was released in 2012, the band soon went silent on studio work. Surprisingly in 2014, they presented 'I Dreamt of a Dragon', their sixth studio album which contained more commercial sound. In early 2016. band came back with another release - their seventh studio album 'DeathOven (Rebels Have no Kings)'. They are currently working on their next record.

Studio albums

Cassettes

Live albums

Singles

Various artists compilation appearances

Collaboration albums

Tribute album appearances

Soundtracks

Video albums

Music videos 

|}

External links 

 NEKA DRUGA SCENA, Davor Bogdanović;  GraphIT 2009
  dreDDup at Discogs

Discographies of Serbian artists
Rock music group discographies